Paid outside closing (POC) is the fees or payments rendered outside normal title insurance and underwriting fees due at the time of closing a loan. When acquiring a mortgage or refinancing, a lender or broker may show that an appraisal fee is POC because the fee is usually due at the time of service, prior to closing. For a $0 closing cost loan, this is often refunded to the borrower at the time of closing.

Debt